Nurse is a progressive/alternative rock band, originally coming together in Fort Wayne, Indiana in 2004. The band formed when the remnants of the defunct progressive rock band Sonorus asked the singer of the dissolving rock band Seraphim to sing for them. They released their first album Walking Past in 2004.

History
The band entered its first decade with the single Revolver in 2004, which, unreleased, didn't chart.

In 2005, guitarist Jake McGrew released his eponymous solo album, Return of the Mountain King, which also did not chart.

In the fall of 2005 the band went on their first independent tour.  They traveled across the east coast, playing in Cincinnati, Dayton, Buffalo, Ithaca, New York City, Philadelphia, Washington D.C., and Atlanta. The band's second album Venti Varietatis was released on September 28, 2006.

Discography

Studio
Walking Past (2004):
You Don't Know Alone
Revolver
From the Crowd
Zero Is for Progress
Apparent Spotless Heart
Veil
Amour Propre
Years Will Be Lost
Placebo
Crispy Apple Lies
Venti Varietatis (2006):
Hibernacula
A Horse, A Grudge
Contusions in the Forehead
Oh, the Things You Could Miss
Doppelganger
A Complex Embrace
Ballad of the Blessed
February 15
Venti Rationis
Garden of Muses

Compilations
Hopeful Cat in a Dog's World (2005) Free Distribution

External links
Nurse on MySpace

Alternative rock groups from Indiana
American progressive rock groups
Musical groups established in 2004